Rajya Sabha elections were held on various dates in 1991, to elect members of the Rajya Sabha, Indian Parliament's upper chamber.

Elections
Elections were held to elect members from various states.

Members elected
The following members are elected in the elections held in 1991. They are members for the term 1991-1997 and retire in year 1997, except in case of the resignation or death before the term.
The list is incomplete.

State - Member - Party

Bye-elections
The following bye elections were held in the year 1991.

State - Member - Party

 Orissa -  Chandra Mohan Sinha - JD ( ele  19/03/1991 term till 1992 )
 Kerala -  T. G. Balakrishna Pillai - INC ( ele  30/07/1991 term till 1992 )
 Madhya Pradesh - Raghavji - BJP ( ele  12/08/1991 term till 1992 )
 Assam - Basanti Sarma - INC ( ele  03/09/1991 term till 1996 ) dea of Dinesh Goswami of AGP on 02/06/1991
 Karnataka -  Satchidananda  - INC ( ele  03/09/1991 term till 1992 )

References

1991 elections in India
1991